Scott Melville and Piet Norval were the defending champions, but competed this year with different partners. Melville teamed up with Rick Leach and lost in second round to Marc-Kevin Goellner and Tom Kempers, while Norval teamed up with Gary Muller and lost in first round to Wayne Arthurs and Neil Broad.

Wayne Ferreira and Yevgeny Kafelnikov won the title by defeating Byron Black and Andrei Olhovskiy 6–1, 7–6 in the final.

Seeds
The first four seeds received a bye into the second round.

Draw

Finals

Top half

Bottom half

References
 Official Results Archive (ATP)
 Official Results Archive (ITF)

Doubles